Western India Football Association (WIFA) is the state governing body for football in the Indian state of Maharashtra. It is affiliated with the All India Football Federation, the sports national governing body.

History
The Bombay Football Association was established in the Bombay province of 1902. It was amalgamated with the older Rovers Football Cup Committee to form the Western India Football Association on 12 July 1911. Justice Russel became president of the WIFA while P. R. Cadell became vice-president, and the objective of was to improve the sport of football in the Bombay state, and in the present-day Maharashtra. Before that, football games were organised for the Rovers Cup, which is India's second oldest football tournament started in 1890.

Then in 2011, after the sudden rise in the popularity of football in India, WIFA decided to revamp the Maharashtra Football System. The first thing they decided to do was renovate Mumbai's only national football stadium, the Cooperage Ground. After that they will work on starting the first ever statewide football league in Maharashtra known as the Maha League. They also announced plans to revive the Rovers Cup which had its last tournament in 2001.

Maharashtra football pyramid
The Maharashtra pyramid consists of the district leagues, of which the Mumbai Football League is the primary league. There is no national state league yet, although the proposed first tier Maha League was never implemented. The lower district leagues are in second tier, followed by lower leagues.

District associations

References

External links 
WIFA Website
Poona District Football Association
Kolhapur United Football Association,(KUFA)

Football governing bodies in India
Football in Maharashtra
1902 establishments in India
Sports organizations established in 1902
Organisations based in Mumbai